FGB may refer to:

 Fibrinogen beta chain, encoded by the FGB gene
 First Guaranty Bank, an American bank
 First Gulf Bank, an Emirati bank
 Franco-German Brigade, a unit of the Eurocorps
 Führer Grenadier Brigade, a unit of the Germany Army active during World War II
 Functional Cargo Block (Russian:), a spacecraft and International Space Station component